CALS (Continuous Acquisition and Life-cycle Support)  is a United States Department of Defense initiative for electronically capturing military documentation and linking related information. 

The initiative has developed a number of standard specifications
(protocols) for the exchange of electronic data with commercial suppliers. These standards are often referred to as simply "CALS". CALS standards have been adopted by several other allied nations. 

The CALS initiative has endorsed IGES and STEP as formats for digital data. 

CALS includes standards for electronic data interchange, electronic technical documentation, and guidelines for process improvement. 

 The CALS Table Model is a DTD standard for representing tables in SGML/XML. (see also DocBook)
 The CALS Raster file format was developed in the mid-1980s to standardize on graphics data interchange for electronic publishing for the federal government.

CALS was known formerly as Computer-aided Acquisition and Logistic Support.

References 

Sources and references that need formatted properly:
 CALS homepage at: (deprecated url) https://web.archive.org/web/19990209043448/http://www.acq.osd.mil/cals/
 Department of Defense office responsible for CALS raster file format:
 CALS Management Support Office (DCLSO)
Office of the Assistant Director for Telecommunications
and Information Systems
Headquarters Defense Logistics Agency
Cameron Station
Alexandria, VA 22314 

 File format is defined by MIL-STD-1840 and MIL-R-28002A

Overview articles
 Dawson, F., and F. Nielsen, "ODA and Document Interchange," UNIX Review, vol. 8, no. 3, 1990, p. 50.
 Hobgood, A., "CALS Implementation--Still a Few Questions," Advanced Imaging, April 1990, pp. 24-25. 

 Details of the file format is available at: https://www.fileformat.info/format/cals/egff.htm

Markup languages
Technical communication